Saruu is a village in Issyk-Kul Region of Kyrgyzstan. It is part of the Jeti-Ögüz District. Its population was 8,217 in 2021. It lies near the outflow of the river Juuku into Lake Issyk-Kul.

Population

References

Populated places in Issyk-Kul Region